Badges of the United States Army are military decorations issued by the United States Department of the Army to soldiers who achieve a variety of qualifications and accomplishments while serving on active and reserve duty in the United States Army.

As described in Army Regulations 670-1 Uniforms and Insignia, badges are categorized into marksmanship, combat and special skill, identification, and foreign. Combat and Special Skill badges are further divided into five groups.

A total of six combat and special skill badges are authorized for wear at one time on service and dress uniforms; this total does not include special skill tabs or special skill tab metal replicas.

Personnel may wear up to three badges above the ribbons or pocket flap, or in a similar location for uniforms without pockets. Personnel may only wear one combat or special skill badges from either group 1 or group 2 above the ribbons. Soldiers may wear up to three badges from groups 3 and 4 above the ribbons. One badge from either group 1 or group 2 may be worn with badges from groups 3 and 4 above the ribbons so long as the total number of badges above the ribbons does not exceed three.

Only three badges (from groups 3, 4, or 5), to include marksmanship badges, can be worn on the pocket flap at one time. This total does not include special skill tab metal replicas. Personnel will wear the driver and mechanic badges only on the wearer's left pocket flap of service and dress uniforms, or in a similar location on uniforms without pockets. Personnel may not attach more than three clasps to the driver and mechanic badges. The driver and mechanic badges are not authorized for wear on utility uniforms.

The order of precedence for combat and special skill badges are established only by group. There is no precedence for combat or special skill badges within the same group. For example, personnel who are authorized to wear the Parachutist and Air Assault badges may determine the order of wear between those two badges.

The 21st century United States Army issues the following military badges (listed below in order of group precedence) which are worn in conjunction with badges of rank and branch insignia.

Combat and Special Skill Badges and Tabs
Source:

Group 1

Group 2

Group 3

Group 4

Group 5

Group 6

Identification Badges

Other Accoutrements

National Guard Badges

Notes
 * = also issued to Air Force airmen
 ** = also issued to airmen and Space Force guardians
No asterisk indicates that the badge is issued only to soldiers

See also
 Combat Service Identification Badge
 Distinctive unit insignia (U.S. Army)
 Military badges of the United States
 Obsolete badges of the United States military
 Shoulder Sleeve Insignia (United States Army)
 Tabs of the United States Army
 Uniforms of the United States Army
 United States military beret flash
 List of United States Army careers
 United States Army branch insignia

References

External links
 Army Regulation 670-1: Wear and Appearance of Army Uniforms and Insignia (PDF file)
 Army Regulation 600-8-22: Military Awards (PDF file)
 Army Service Uniform - Ribbons Poster (PDF file)

Awards and decorations of the United States Army
United States military badges
United States military specialty insignia